Slippery Rock Creek is a stream in western Pennsylvania, a tributary of Connoquenessing Creek.

Course and history 
From its source in Hilliards in Butler County, it flows through McConnells Mill State Park before flowing into the Connoquenessing in Ellwood City. Then, the Connoquenessing flows into the Beaver River just three miles south from the mouth of Slippery Rock.  

There are multiple stories about the origin of the creek's name. In one story,  the indigenous Seneca Indians called the creek Wechachapohka or "Slippery Rock", denoting the rocks at the bottom of the stream that could be easily crossed by natives wearing moccasins but not by soldiers wearing heavy boots. In another more prosaic story, the Native Americans coined the name due to natural oil seeps in and around the present-day McConnells Mill State Park that made the rocks slippery; those seeps were later eliminated by fossil fuel extraction.

Recreation 
Slippery Rock Creek is a favorite for whitewater kayakers and canoeists from the region. With Class-II and -III rapids and engaging beauty, it attracts regular paddlers from novice to advanced level. Slippery Rock Creek, however, can be very dangerous. The rocks are indeed deceptively slippery, and throughout the year, there are numerous reports of drowning incidents, mostly near the McConnells Mill State Park. In and around that state park, the creek formed a rugged gorge that is popular with hikers, and the Slippery Rock Gorge Trail along the creek and its Hell Run tributary has been named as one of the best hiking trails in Pennsylvania.

Watershed

Tributaries

See also
 List of rivers of Pennsylvania

References

External links
 U.S. Geological Survey: PA stream gaging stations
 National Whitewater River Inventory: Slippery Rock Creek (Upper)
 National Whitewater River Inventory: Slippery Rock Creek (Lower)
Slippery Rock Watershed Coalition

Rivers of Pennsylvania
Tributaries of the Beaver River
Rivers of Beaver County, Pennsylvania
Rivers of Butler County, Pennsylvania
Rivers of Lawrence County, Pennsylvania